Murcia is the capital city of the Region of Murcia in Spain.

Murcia may also refer to:

Places
 Region of Murcia, a single-province autonomous community in southeast Spain
 Murcia (Spanish Congress Electoral District)
 Taifa of Murcia, medieval Muslim municipality
 Murcia, Negros Occidental, a town in the Philippines

People
 José Murcia, a Spanish footballer
 Santiago de Murcia, a Spanish guitarist and composer

Other uses
 Murcia (mythology), a little-known goddess in ancient Rome

See also
 Mercia (disambiguation)
 Murica (disambiguation)
 Mursia